Vilkij-e Jonubi Rural District is in Vilkij District of Namin County, Ardabil province, Iran. At the census of 2006, its population was 4,229 in 888 households; there were 4,399 inhabitants in 1,218 households at the following census of 2011; and in the most recent census of 2016, the population of the rural district was 3,916 in 1,143 households. The largest of its five villages was Hur, with 3,248 people.

References 

Namin County

Rural Districts of Ardabil Province

Populated places in Ardabil Province

Populated places in Namin County